Külma may refer to several places in Estonia:
Külma, Saare County, village in Estonia
Külma, Võru County, village in Estonia